Omusati (after the dominant tree in the area) is one of the fourteen regions of Namibia, its capital is Outapi. The towns of Okahao, Oshikuku and Ruacana as well as the self-governed village Tsandi are situated in this region. , Omusati had 148,834 registered voters.

The region is home to the Ruacana Falls and the Omugulugwombashe heritage site, where the Namibian struggle for independence started in 1966.

Geography
In the north, Omusati borders the Cunene Province of Angola.  Domestically, it borders the following regions:
Ohangwena - northeast
Oshana - east
Kunene - south and west

The region got its name from the Mopane tree which is the dominant species in the region. The Makalani palms decrease rapidly westwards from the border with Oshana region. The change in vegetation type reflects ecological conditions forming a natural boundary between the two regions.

The region is home to the Ruacana Falls. The waterfall is 120 meters (390 ft) high and 700 meters (2,300 ft) wide in full flood and is among the largest waterfalls in Africa, both by volume and width.

Economy and infrastructure
The northern part of Omusati is far more densely populated than the south, where the grazing is of poor quality and the water is generally saline. This is primarily an agricultural region where mahangu, also known as pearl millet, is successfully grown. A canal carries water from the Ruacana river to Oshakati, passing through Outapi. Water from this canal has been used to irrigate a large, government-run farm at Etunda where crops from maize to watermelon to bananas are grown. The electrical network covers towns including Outapi, Ruacana, Tsandi, Oshikuku, and Okahao.

The region is traversed by a high standard trunk road which provides a direct link to adjacent regions and the rest of the country. Although passenger and freight transport along this route is easy, the rest of this road network, in common with all the communal areas of northern Namibia, is of poor quality. Okahao and Outapi both have small hospitals, and a network of clinics provides basic services.

Only 17% of households in Omusati have access to improved sanitation (toilet facilities). According to the 2012 Namibia Labour Force Survey, unemployment in the Region is 28.9%. Omusati has 274 schools with a total of 86,365 pupils.

Politics
The governor of Omusati is Erkki Endjala. The region comprises twelve constituencies:
 Anamulenge
 Elim
 Etayi
 Ogongo
 Okahao
 Okalongo
 Onesi
 Oshikuku
 Otamanzi
 Outapi
 Ruacana
 Tsandi

Electorally, Omusati region is consistently dominated by the South West Africa People's Organization (SWAPO). For instance, Omusati voters selected SWAPO with 97.68% of their votes in the 2004 parliamentary election, and again with 98% in the 2014 election.

Regional elections
The 2015 local and regional elections saw SWAPO obtain 99.4% of the total votes (2010: 99.0) and win uncontested eight of the twelve Omusati constituencies, and two of the five towns. The remaining four constituencies SWAPO won by a landslide, with results ranging from 89% (Ruacana) to 98% (Ogongo). Although SWAPO's support dropped to 86.5% of the total votes in the 2020 regional election, it again won all constituencies by a large margin.

References

External links

 
Oshiwambo words and phrases
Regions of Namibia
States and territories established in 1992
1992 establishments in Namibia